Prince Hui of the Second Rank, or simply Prince Hui, was the title of a princely peerage used in China during the Manchu-led Qing dynasty (1644–1912). As the Prince Hui peerage was not awarded "iron-cap" status, this meant that each successive bearer of the title would normally start off with a title downgraded by one rank vis-à-vis that held by his predecessor. However, the title would generally not be downgraded to any lower than a feng'en fuguo gong except under special circumstances.

The first bearer of the title was Bo'erguoluo (博爾果洛), Šose's second son and a great-grandson of Nurhaci (the founder of the Qing dynasty). In 1665, Bo'erguoluo was granted the title "Prince Hui of the Second Rank" by the Kangxi Emperor. The title was passed down over four generations and held by three persons.

Members of the Prince Hui peerage

 Bo'erguoluo (博爾果洛; 1651–1712), Šose's second son, held the title Prince Hui of the Second Rank from 1665 to 1684, stripped of his title in 1684
 Fucang (福蒼), Bo'erguoluo's fifth son, posthumously honoured as a beile in 1750
 Qiulin (球琳), Fucang's eldest son, held the title of a junwang from 1728 to 1746, demoted to beile in 1746, stripped of his title in 1757
 Dejin (德謹), Qiulin's second son, held the title of a feng'en fuguo gong from 1758 to 1763, stripped of his title in 1763
 Dechun (德春), Qiulin's third son, held the title of a third class zhenguo jiangjun from 1764 to 1765
 Desan (德三), Qiulin's fourth son, held the title of a third class fuguo jiangjun from 1768 to 1791
 Tuyi (徙義), Desan's eldest son, held the title of a fengguo jiangjun from 1792 to 1806, stripped of his title in 1806
 Yitai (伊泰), Bo'erguoluo's son
 Minghe (明赫), Yitai's son, held the title of a feng'en zhenguo gong from 1737 to 1739, stripped of his title in 1739
 Sule (素勒), Minghe's son
 Wanxiang (萬祥), Sule's second son, held the title of a feng'en jiangjun from 1806 to 1835
 Henglin (亨麟), Wanxiang's second son, held the title of a feng'en jiangjun from 1835 to 1874
 Yingcui (英萃), Henglin's son
 Zhongduan (中端), Yingcui's son, held the title of a feng'en jiangjun from 1874 to 1888
 Yingmao (英茂), Henglin's third son, held the title of a feng'en jiangjun from 1888
 Wancheng (萬成), Sule's son
 Hengjie (亨傑), Wancheng's son
 Yingqin (英芹), Hengjie's son
 Dingyan (定埏), Yingqin's second son, held the title of a feng'en jiangjun

Family tree

See also
 Prince Zhuang
 Royal and noble ranks of the Qing dynasty

References
 

Qing dynasty princely peerages